Userkaf (known in Ancient Greek as) was a pharaoh of ancient Egypt and the founder of the Fifth Dynasty. He reigned for seven to eight years in the early 25th century BC, during the Old Kingdom period. He probably belonged to a branch of the Fourth Dynasty royal family, although his parentage is uncertain; he could have been the son of Khentkaus I. He had at least one daughter and very probably a son, Sahure, with his consort Neferhetepes. This son succeeded him as pharaoh.

His reign heralded the ascendancy of the cult of Ra, who effectively became Egypt's state god during the Fifth Dynasty. Userkaf may have been a high-priest of Ra before ascending the throne, and built a sun temple, known as the Nekhenre, between Abusir and Abu Gurab. In doing so, he instituted a tradition followed by his successors over a period of 80 years. The Nekhenre mainly functioned as a mortuary temple for the setting sun. Rites performed in the temple were primarily concerned with Ra's creator function and his role as father of the king. Taken with the reduction in the size of the royal mortuary complex, this suggests a more concrete separation between the sun god and the king than in the preceding dynasties. After Userkaf's death, his temple was the subject of four building phases, during which it acquired a large obelisk.

Userkaf built a pyramid in Saqqara close to that of Djoser, a location that forced architects to put the associated mortuary temple in an unusual position, to the south of the pyramid. The latter was much smaller than those built during the Fourth Dynasty but the mortuary complex was lavishly and extensively decorated with fine painted reliefs. In addition to his own pyramid and temple, Userkaf built a smaller pyramid close to his for one of his queens, likely Neferhetepes. Although Userkaf was the object of a funerary cult after his death like the other Fifth Dynasty kings, his was relatively unimportant, and was abandoned after the end of the dynasty. Little is known of his activities beyond the construction of his pyramid and sun temple. The Old Kingdom royal annals record offerings of beer, bread and lands to various gods, some of which may correspond to building projects on Userkaf's behalf, including the temple of Montu in El-Tod where he is the earliest attested pharaoh. Beyond the borders of Egypt, a military expedition to Canaan or the Eastern Desert may have taken place, and trade contacts with the Aegean seem to have existed at the time.

Family

Parents and consort
The identity of Userkaf's parents is uncertain, but he undoubtedly had family connections with the rulers of the preceding Fourth Dynasty.  Egyptologist Miroslav Verner proposes that he was a son of Menkaure by one of his secondary queens and possibly a full brother to his predecessor and the last king of the Fourth Dynasty, Shepseskaf.

Alternatively, Nicolas Grimal, Peter Clayton and Michael Rice propose that Userkaf was the son of a Neferhetepes, whom Grimal, Giovanna Magi and Rice see as a daughter of Djedefre and Hetepheres II. The identity of Neferhetepes's husband in this hypothesis is unknown, but Grimal conjectures that he may have been the "priest of Ra, lord of Sakhebu", mentioned in Westcar papyrus. Aidan Dodson and Dyan Hilton propose that Neferhetepes was buried in the pyramid next to that of Userkaf, which is believed to have belonged to a woman of the same name.

The location of the pyramid attributed to Neferhetepes, however, strongly suggests that she may instead have been Userkaf's wife. If so she should be identified with the Neferhetepes who is the mother of Userkaf's successor and likely son, Sahure. A relief from Sahure's causeway depicts this king and his queen together with the king's mother, identified as a Neferhetepes, which very likely makes her Userkaf's wife. Like Grimal, Jaromír Malek sees her as a daughter of Djedefre and Hetepheres II. Following this hypothesis, Mark Lehner also suggests that Userkaf's mother may have been Khentkaus I, an idea shared by Arielle Kozloff.

Dodson and Hilton argue that Neferhetepes is not given the title of king's wife in later documents pertaining to her mortuary cult, although they note that this absence is inconclusive. They propose that Userkaf's queen may have been Khentkaus I, a hypothesis shared by Selim Hassan. Clayton and Rosalie and Anthony David concur, further positing that Khentkaus I was Menkaure's daughter.  Bernhard Grdseloff argues that Userkaf, as a descendant of pharaoh Djedefre marrying a woman from the main royal line—that of Khafre and Menkaure—could have unified two rival factions within the royal family and ended possible dynastic struggles. Alternatively, Userkaf could have been the high priest of Ra before ascending the throne, giving him sufficient influence to marry Shepseskaf's widow in the person of Khentkaus I.

Children
Many Egyptologists, including Verner, Zemina, David, and Baker, believe that Sahure was Userkaf's son rather than his brother as suggested by the Westcar papyrus. The main evidence is a relief showing Sahure and his mother Neferhetepes, this being also the name of the queen who is believed to have owned the pyramid next to Userkaf's. An additional argument supporting the filiation of Sahure is the location of his pyramid in close proximity to Userkaf's sun temple. No other child of Userkaf has been identified except a daughter named Khamaat, mentioned in inscriptions uncovered in the mastaba of Ptahshepses.

Reign

Duration
The exact duration of Userkaf's reign is unknown. Given the historical and archeological evidence, the consensus among Egyptologists is that he ruled for seven to eight years at the start of Egypt's Fifth Dynasty. First, an analysis of the nearly contemporaneous Old Kingdom royal annals shows that Userkaf's reign was recorded on eight compartments corresponding to at least seven full years but not much more. The latest legible year recorded on the annals for Userkaf is that of his third cattle count, to evaluate the amount of taxes to be levied on the population. This significant event is believed to have been biennial during the Old Kingdom period, meaning that the third cattle count represents the sixth year of his reign. The same count is also attested in a mason's inscription found on a stone of Userkaf's sun temple. Second, Userkaf is given a reign of seven years on the third column, row 17, of the Turin Royal Canon, a document copied during the reign of Ramesses II from earlier sources. Third, very few small artefacts bearing Userkaf's name have been found, witnessing a short reign. These include a gold mounted diorite jar, a five-deben stone weight and a stone cylinder seal from Elephantine, now all in the Metropolitan Museum of Art, as well as an ivory cylinder seal in the British Museum and yet another seal in the Bulaq Museum.

The only historical source favouring a longer reign is the Aegyptiaca (Αἰγυπτιακά), a history of Egypt written in the 3rd century BC, during the reign of Ptolemy II (283–246 BC) by Manetho. No copies of the Aegyptiaca have survived and it is now known only through later writings by Sextus Julius Africanus and Eusebius. According to the Byzantine scholar George Syncellus, Africanus wrote that the Aegyptiaca mentioned the succession "Usercherês → Sephrês → Nefercherês" at the start of the Fifth Dynasty. Usercherês, Sephrês, and Nefercherês are believed to be the Hellenized forms for Userkaf, Sahure and Neferirkare, respectively.  In particular, Manetho's reconstruction of the early Fifth Dynasty is in agreement with those given on the Abydos king list and the Saqqara Tablet, two lists of kings written during the reigns of Seti I and Ramesses II, respectively. In contrast with the Turin canon, Africanus's report of the Aegyptiaca estimates that Userkaf reigned for 28 years, much longer than the modern consensus.

Founder of the Fifth Dynasty

The division of ancient Egyptian kings into dynasties is an invention of Manetho's Aegyptiaca, intended to adhere more closely to the expectations of Manetho's patrons, the Greek rulers of Ptolemaic Egypt.
A distinction between the Fourth and Fifth dynasties may nonetheless have been recognised by the ancient Egyptians, as recorded by a much older tradition found in the tale of the Westcar papyrus. In this story, King Khufu of the Fourth Dynasty is foretold the demise of his line and the rise of a new dynasty through the accession of three brothers, sons of Ra, to the throne of Egypt. This tale dates to the Seventeenth or possibly the Twelfth Dynasty.

Beyond such historical evidence, the division between the Fourth and Fifth Dynasties seems to reflect actual changes taking place at the time, in particular in Egyptian religion, and in the king's role. Ra's primacy over the rest of the Egyptian pantheon and the increased royal devotion given to him made Ra a sort of state-god, a novelty in comparison with the Fourth Dynasty, when more emphasis was put on royal burials.

Userkaf's position before ascending to the throne is unknown. Grimal states that he could have been a high-priest of Ra in Heliopolis or Sakhebu, a cult-center of Ra mentioned in the Westcar papyrus. The hypothesis of a connection between the origins of the Fifth Dynasty and Sakhebu was first proposed by the Egyptologist Flinders Petrie, who noted that in Egyptian hieroglyphs the name of Sakhebu resembles that of Elephantine, the city that Manetho gives as the cradle of the Fifth Dynasty. According to Petrie, positing that the Westcar papyrus records a tradition that remembered the origins of the Fifth Dynasty could explain Manetho's records, especially given that there is otherwise no particular connection between Elephantine and Fifth Dynasty pharaohs.

Activities in Egypt

Beyond the constructions of his mortuary complex and sun temple, little is known of Userkaf. Malek says his short reign may indicate that he was elderly upon becoming pharaoh. Verner sees Userkaf's reign as significant in that it marks the apex of the sun cult, the pharaonic title of "Son of Ra" becoming systematic from his reign onwards.

In Upper Egypt, Userkaf either commissioned or enlarged the temple of Montu at Tod, where he is the earliest attested pharaoh. Due to structural alterations, in particular during the early Middle Kingdom, New Kingdom and Ptolemaic periods, little of Userkaf's original temple has survived. It was a small mud-brick chapel including a granite pillar, inscribed with the name of the king.

Further domestic activities may be inferred from the annals of the Old Kingdom, written during Neferirkare's or Nyuserre's reign. They record that Userkaf gave endowments for the gods of Heliopolis in the second and sixth years of his reign as well as to the gods of Buto in his sixth year, both of which may have been destined for building projects on Userkaf's behalf. In the same vein, the annals record a donation of land to Horus during Userkaf's sixth year on the throne, this time explicitly mentioning "building [Horus'] temple".

Other gods honoured by Userkaf include Ra and Hathor, both of whom received land donations recorded in the annals, as well as Nekhbet, Wadjet, the "gods of the divine palace of Upper Egypt" and the "gods of the estate Djebaty" who received bread, beer and land. Finally, a fragmentary piece of text in the annals suggests that Min might also have benefited from Userkaf's donations. Further evidence for religious activities taking place at the time is given by a royal decree found in the mastaba of the administration official Nykaankh buried at Tihna al-Jabal in Middle Egypt. By this decree, Userkaf donates and reforms several royal domains for the maintenance of the cult of Hathor and installs Nykaankh as priest of this cult.

Excavations of the pyramid temple of Amenemhat I at Lisht produced a block decorated with a relief bearing the titulary of Userkaf. The block had been reused as a building material. The relief mentions a journey of the king to the temple of Bastet in a ship called "He who controls the subjects [...]".

While Userkaf chose Saqqara to build his pyramid complex, officials at the time, including the vizier Seshathotep Heti, continued to build their tombs in the Giza necropolis.

Trade and military activities

Userkaf's reign might have witnessed the birth of direct trade between Egypt and its Aegean neighbors as shown by a series of reliefs from his mortuary temple representing ships engaged in what may be a naval expedition. Further evidence for such contacts is a stone vessel bearing the name of his sun temple that was uncovered on the Greek island of Kythira. This vase is the earliest evidence of commercial contacts between Egypt and the Aegean world.  Finds in Anatolia, dating to the reigns of Menkauhor Kaiu and Djedkare Isesi, demonstrate that these contacts continued throughout the Fifth Dynasty.

South of Egypt, Userkaf launched a military expedition into Nubia, while the Old Kingdom annals record that he received tribute from a region that is either the Eastern Desert or Canaan in the form of a workforce of one chieftain and 70 foreigners (likely women), as well as 303 "pacified rebels" destined to work on Userkaf's pyramid. These might have been prisoners from another military expedition to the east of Egypt or rebels exiled from Egypt prior to Userkaf's second year on the throne and now willing to reintegrate into Egyptian society. According to the Egyptologist Hartwig Altenmüller these people might have been punished following dynastic struggles connected with the end of the Fourth Dynasty. Finally, some reliefs from Userkaf's mortuary temple depict a successful military venture against Asiatic Bedouins, whom Userkaf is shown smiting, as well as a naval expedition.

Statuary 

Several fragmentary statues of Userkaf have been uncovered. These include a bust of the goddess Neith in his likeness found in his sun temple at Abusir, now in the Egyptian Museum. It is considered particularly important as it is among the very few sculptures in the round from the Old Kingdom that show the monarch wearing the Deshret of Lower Egypt. The head was uncovered in 1957 during the joint excavation expedition of the German and Swiss Institutes of Cairo. Another head which might belong to Userkaf, wearing the Hedjet of Upper Egypt and made of painted limestone, is in the Cleveland Museum of Art.

The head of a colossal larger-than-life sphinx statue of Userkaf, now in the Egyptian Museum, was found in the temple courtyard of his mortuary complex at Saqqara by Cecil Mallaby Firth in 1928. This colossal head of pink Aswan granite shows the king wearing the nemes headdress with a cobra on his forehead. It is the largest surviving head dating to the Old Kingdom other than that of the Great Sphinx of Giza and the only colossal royal statue from this period. Many more fragments of statues of the king made of diorite, slate and granite but none of limestone have been found at the same site. Some bore Userkaf's cartouche and Horus name.

Kozloff notes the youthful features of Userkaf on most of his representations and concludes that if these are good indications of his age, then he might have come to the throne as an adolescent and died in his early twenties.

Sun temple

Significance
Userkaf is the first pharaoh to build a dedicated temple to the sun god Ra in the Memphite necropolis north of Abusir, on a promontory on the desert edge just south of the modern locality of Abu Gurab. Works might have started during Userkaf's fifth or sixth year of reign.
The only plausible precedent for Userkaf's sun temple was the temple associated with the Great Sphinx of Giza, which may have been dedicated to Ra and may thus have served similar purposes. In any case, Userkaf's successors for the next 80 years followed his course of action: sun temples were built by all subsequent Fifth Dynasty pharaohs until Menkauhor Kaiu, with the possible exception of Shepseskare, whose reign might have been too short to build one. Userkaf's choice of Abusir as the site of his sun temple has not been satisfactorily explained, the site being of no particular significance up to that point. Userkaf's choice may have influenced subsequent kings of the Fifth Dynasty who made Abusir the royal necropolis until the reign of Menkauhor Kaiu.

For the Egyptologist Hans Goedicke, Userkaf's decision to build a temple for the setting sun separated from his own mortuary complex is a manifestation of and response to sociopolitical tensions, if not turmoil, at the end of the Fourth Dynasty. The construction of the sun temple permitted a distinction between the king's personal  afterlife and religious issues pertaining to the setting sun, which had been so closely intertwined in the pyramid complexes of Giza and in the pharaohs of the Fourth Dynasty. Thus, Userkaf's pyramid would be isolated in Saqqara, not even surrounded by a wider cemetery for his contemporaries, while the sun temple would serve the social need for a solar cult, which, while represented by the king, would not be exclusively embodied by him anymore. Malek similarly sees the construction of sun temples as marking a shift from the royal cult, which was so preponderant during the early Fourth Dynasty, to the cult of the sun god Ra. A result of these changes is that the king was now primarily revered as the son of Ra.

Name
The ancient Egyptians called Userkaf's sun temple Nekhenre (Nḫn Rˁ.w), which has been variously translated as "The fortress of Ra", "The stronghold of Ra", "The residence of Ra", "Ra's storerooms" and "The birthplace of Ra".
According to Coppens, Janák, Lehner, Verner, Vymazalová, Wilkinson and Zemina, Nḫn here might actually refer instead to the town of Nekhen, also known as Hierakonpolis. Hierakonpolis was a stronghold and seat of power for the late predynastic kings who unified Egypt. They propose that Userkaf may have chosen this name to emphasise the victorious and unifying nature of the cult of Ra or, at least, to represent some symbolic meaning in relation to kingship. Nekhen was also the name of an institution responsible for providing resources to the living king as well as to his funerary cult after his death. In consequence, the true meaning of Nekhenre might be closer to "Ra's Nekhen" or "The Hierakonpolis of Ra".

Function

The sun temple of Userkaf first appears as pyramid XVII in Karl Richard Lepsius' pioneering list of pyramids in the mid-19th century. Its true nature was recognised by Ludwig Borchardt in the early 20th century but it was only thoroughly excavated from 1954 until 1957 by a team including Hanns Stock, Werner Kaiser, Peter Kaplony, Wolfgang Helck, and Herbert Ricke. According to the royal annals, the construction of the temple started in Userkaf's fifth year on the throne and, on that occasion, he donated 24 royal domains for the maintenance of the temple.

It served primarily as a place of worship for the mortuary cult of Ra and was supposed to relate it to the royal funerary cult. Structurally, the sun temple and the royal mortuary complex were very similar, as they included a valley temple close to the Nile and a causeway leading up to the high temple on the desert plateau. In other ways their architectures differed. For example, the valley temple of the sun temple complex is not oriented to any cardinal point, rather pointing vaguely to Heliopolis, and the causeway is not aligned with the axis of the high temple. The Abusir Papyri, a collection of administrative documents from later in the Fifth Dynasty, indicates that the cultic activities taking place in the sun and mortuary temples were related; for instance, offerings for both cults were dispatched from the sun temple. In fact, sun temples built during this period were meant to play for Ra the same role that the pyramid played for the king. They were funerary temples for the sun god, where his renewal and rejuvenation, necessary to maintain the order of the world, could take place. Rites performed in the temple were thus primarily concerned with Ra's creator function as well as his role as father of the king. During his lifetime, the king would appoint his closest officials to the running of the temple, allowing them to benefit from the temple's income and thus ensuring their loyalty. After the pharaoh's death, the sun temple's income would be associated with the pyramid complex, supporting the royal funerary cult.

Construction works on the Nekhenre did not stop with Userkaf's death but continued in at least four building phases, the first of which may have taken place under Sahure, and then under his successors Neferirkare Kakai and Nyuserre Ini. By the end of Userkaf's rule, the sun temple did not yet house the large granite obelisk on a pedestal that it would subsequently acquire. Instead its main temple seems to have comprised a rectangular enclosure wall with a high mast set on a mound in its center, possibly as a perch for the sun god's falcon. To the east of this mound was a mudbrick altar with statue shrines on both sides. According to the royal annals, from his sixth year on the throne, Userkaf commanded that two oxen and two geese were to be sacrificed daily in the Nekhenre. These animals seem to have been butchered in or around the high temple, the causeway being wide enough to lead live oxen up it. Kozloff sees these decisions as a manifestation of Userkaf's young age and of the power of the priesthood of Ra rather than as a result of his personal devotion to the sun god.

Pyramid complex

Pyramid of Userkaf

Location
Unlike most pharaohs of the Fourth Dynasty, Userkaf built a modest pyramid at North Saqqara, at the north-eastern edge of the enclosure wall surrounding Djoser's pyramid complex. This decision, probably political, may be connected to the return to the city of Memphis as center of government, of which Saqqara to the west is the necropolis, as well as a desire to rule according to principles and methods closer to Djoser's. In particular, like Djoser's and unlike the pyramid complexes of Giza, Userkaf's mortuary complex is not surrounded by a necropolis for his followers. For Goedicke, the wider religious role played by Fourth Dynasty pyramids was now to be played by the sun temple, while the king's mortuary complex was to serve only the king's personal funerary needs. Hence, Userkaf's choice of Saqqara is a manifestation of a return to a "harmonious and altruistic" notion of kingship which Djoser seemed to have symbolized, against that represented by Khufu who had almost personally embodied the sun-god.

Pyramid architecture
Userkaf's pyramid complex was called Wab-Isut Userkaf, meaning "Pure are the places of Userkaf" or "Userkaf's pyramid, holiest of places".
By volume, this made it the second smallest king's pyramid finished during the Fifth Dynasty after that of the final ruler, Unas. The reduced size of the pyramid as compared to those of Userkaf's Fourth Dynasty predecessors owes much to the rise of the cult of Ra which diverted spiritual and financial resources away from the king's burial. The pyramid was built following techniques established during the Fourth Dynasty, with a core made of stones rather than employing rubble as in subsequent pyramids of the Fifth and Sixth Dynasties. The core was so poorly laid out, however, that once the pyramid's outer casing of fine limestone had been robbed, it crumbled into a heap of rubble. The burial chamber was lined with large limestone blocks, its roof made of gabled limestone beams.

Mortuary temple

The pyramid's funerary complex is peculiar in that Userkaf's mortuary temple is located on the southern side rather than the usual eastern one. This was almost certainly due to the presence of a large moat surrounding Djoser's pyramid and running to the east as proposed by Verner, or to the general topography of Saqqara and the presence of older tombs in the vicinity as expounded by Edwards and Lauer.
In any case, this means that Userkaf chose to be buried in close proximity to Djoser even though this implied that he could not use the normal layout for his temple. Rainer Stadelmann believes that the reason for the choices of location and layout were practical and due to the presence of the necropolis's administrative center on the north-east corner of Djoser's complex. Verner rather identifies a desire on Userkaf's behalf to benefit from the religious significance of Djoser's complex. Alternatively, Userkaf's decision to locate the temple on the pyramid's southern side may be motivated by entirely religious reasons, with the Egyptologists Herbert Ricke and Richard H. Wilkinson proposing that it could have ensured the temple's year-round exposure to the sun, while Altenmüller suggests it was aligned with an obelisk that could have been located nearby.

The mortuary temple walls were extensively adorned with raised reliefs of exceptional quality. Scant remains of pigments on some reliefs show that these reliefs were originally painted. Userkaf's pyramid temple represents an important innovation in this respect; he was the first pharaoh to introduce nature scenes in his funerary temple, including scenes of hunting in the marshes that would subsequently become common. The artistic work is highly detailed, with a single relief showing no less than seven different species of birds and a butterfly. Hunting scenes symbolised the victory of the king over the forces of chaos, and might thus have illustrated Userkaf's role as Iry-Maat, that is "the one who establishes Maat", which was one of Userkaf's names.

The funerary complex of Userkaf was accessed from the Nile via a valley temple connected to the mortuary temple with a causeway. This valley temple is yet to be excavated.

Pyramid complex of Neferhetepes

Pyramid

Some  to the south of Userkaf's funerary enclosure, there stands a separate pyramid complex built in all likelihood for one of his queens. The pyramid, built on an east–west axis, is ruined and only a small mound of rubble can be seen today. Although no name has been identified in the pyramid proper, its owner is believed by Egyptologists including Cecil Mallaby Firth, Bernard Grdseloff, Audran Labrousse (fr), Jean-Philippe Lauer  and Tarek El-Awady to have been Neferhetepes, mother of Sahure and in all probability Userkaf's consort.

The core of the main and cult pyramids were built with the same technique, consisting of three horizontal layers of roughly hewn local limestone blocks and gypsum mortar. The core was covered with an outer casing of fine Tura limestone, now gone. The pyramid was so extensively used as a stone quarry that even its internal chambers are exposed. These chambers are a scaled-down version of those in Userkaf's main pyramid, but without storage rooms.

Mortuary temple
The queen's pyramid complex had its own separate mortuary temple, located on the pyramid eastern side. The temple entrance led to an open pillared courtyard, stretching from east to west, where the ritual cleaning and preparation of the offerings took place. A sacrificial chapel adjoined the pyramid side and there were three statue niches and a few magazine chambers to store offerings. The temple halls were adorned with reliefs of animal processions and carriers of offerings moving towards the shrine of the queen.

Legacy

Funerary cult

Old Kingdom

Like other Fourth and Fifth Dynasty pharaohs, Userkaf received a funerary cult after his death. His cult was state-sponsored and relied on goods for offerings produced in dedicated agricultural estates established during his lifetime, as well as such resources as fabrics brought from the "house of silver" (the treasury).

The cult flourished in the early to mid-Fifth Dynasty, as evidenced by the tombs and seals of participating priests and officials such as Nykaure, who served in the cults of Userkaf and Neferefre; Nykaankh and Khnumhotep, who served in Userkaf's pyramid complex; Ptahhotep, a priest of the Nekhenre and of Userkaf's mortuary temple; Tepemankh, Nenkheftka and Senuankh, who served in the cults of Userkaf and Sahure; Pehenukai, a vizier under Sahure and Neferirkare Kakai; and Nykuhor, a judge, inspector of scribes, privy councillor, and priest of funerary cults of Userkaf and Neferefre.

Middle Kingdom
The long-term importance of Userkaf's official cult may be judged by its abandonment at the end of the Fifth Dynasty. In comparison, the official funerary cult of at least one of Userkaf's successors, Nyuserre Ini, may have lasted until the Middle Kingdom period. The mortuary temple of Userkaf must have been in ruins or dismantled by the time of the Twelfth Dynasty as indicated, for example, by a block showing the king performing a ritual found re-used as a construction material in the pyramid of Amenemhat I. Userkaf was not the only king whose mortuary temple met this fate: Nyuserre's temple was targeted even though its last priests were serving in it around this time. These facts hint at a lapse of royal interest in the state-sponsored funerary cults of Old Kingdom rulers.

Later periods
Examples of personal devotions on behalf of pious individuals endured much longer. For example, Userkaf is depicted on a relief from the Saqqara tomb of the priest Mehu, who lived during the Ramesside period (c. 1292–1189 BCE). Early in this period, during the reign of Ramesses II, Ramesses's fourth son, Khaemwaset (fl. c. 1280–1225 BCE), ordered restoration work on Userkaf's pyramid as well as on other pyramids of the Fifth Dynasty. In the case of Userkaf, this is established by inscriptions on stone cladding from the pyramid field showing Khaemwaset with offering bearers.

The reliefs from Userkaf's funerary complex were copied during the 26th Dynasty of the Late Period. A particular example is a relief showing Userkaf wearing a boatman's circlet with streamers and urae with the horns of an Atef crown, a motif which had disappeared from Egyptian arts since Userkaf's time.

In contemporary culture
Egyptian Nobel Prize for Literature-laureate Naguib Mahfouz published a short story in 1945 about Userkaf entitled "Afw al-malik Usirkaf: uqsusa misriya". This short story was translated by Raymond Stock as "King Userkaf's Forgiveness" in the collection of short stories Sawt min al-ʻalam al-akhar, whose title translates to Voices from the other world: ancient Egyptian tales.

Notes, references and sources

Notes

References

Sources

 

25th-century BC Pharaohs
Pharaohs of the Fifth Dynasty of Egypt